= Gunung Berau Nature Reserve =

Nature reserve in Indonesia

The Gunung Berau Nature Reserve is found in Indonesia. This site is 1100 km^{2}.

The Gunung Berau Nature Reserve is known for diverse flora and fauna, along with other species. It collects some groups of the surrounding area which include the 52 mammalian species, 118 bird species, 18 bat species, 12 amphibian species, several reptiles such as lizards, and 45 tree species.
